IPO is a station on Line D (yellow line) of the Porto Metro, Portugal.

The station is at the northern end of the University of Porto campus and is named after the nearby  Instituto Português de Oncologia (Portuguese Oncology Institute).

Although Line D opened in 2005, the IPO and Hospital de São João stations did not open until April 2006 due to safety concerns. Before this time the line terminated at the preceding Pólo Universitário station. The line operates as a ground-level tram at this station.

See also
 IPO (disambiguation)

Porto Metro stations
Railway stations opened in 2006